Rembrandt: A Self-Portrait is a 1954 American short documentary film about the artist Rembrandt produced by Morrie Roizman, a former editor for The March of Time. This film shows a series of Rembrandt's artwork, including painting and drawings spanning his entire life and being shown as related of events throughout his life are narrated.

Rembrandt: A Self-Portrait was nominated for an Academy Award for Best Documentary Short.

References

External links

1954 films
1954 short films
1954 documentary films
American short documentary films
1950s short documentary films
Documentary films about painters
Films about Rembrandt
Rembrandt studies
1950s English-language films
1950s American films